Lawapur Narayan is a Village situated in Vaishali District, Bihar, India.

This village had bigger area. and many different cast are located in this village . but the majority of them are Brahman and yadav. 
Nearest market is Mahnar bazar .

Locality Name : Lavapur Narayan ( लवपुर नारायण )
Block Name : Mahnar
District : Vaishali
State : Bihar
Division : Tirhut
Language : Maithili and Hindi, Urdu, Bajjika.

Demographics of Lavapur Narayan
Maithili is the Local Language here.

Politics in Lavapur Narayan

JD(U), LJP, BJP, Lok Jan Shakti Party, INC are the major political parties in this area.

Polling Stations /Booths near Lavapur Narayan

1)Madhya Vidyalay Bhathahi

2)Madhya Vidyalay Panapur Silauthar Pashchim Bhag

3)Prathamik Vidyalay Bajitapur Chakusman

4)Madhya Vidyalay Gorigama Uttar Bhag

5)Madhya Vidyalay Dedhpura Purbi Bhag (baya Bhag)

The nearest railway station is mahnar railway station.

Lawapur Narayan is also considered to be an open door for worshippers as the sacred(Pavitra Mandir asthal)is the center of faith for many devotees which glorify the existence of the village as well.
Oldest temple of lord Shiva(Mahadeva)has always been the main attraction and a place for spirituality in the village.
Ma durga mandir which was built by jha brothers (late Chandra mohan,Shani mohan and Manmohan jha) in 2010,obliged to perform daily morning and evening veneration or pooja.
Veneration enthralls devotees from all across the area and substantially the temple province has turned out to become the area for attaining peace,equanimity,spirituality and performing religious sacraments for locals.
Apparently, religious fair specially during Durga Pooja has been more prominent to glorify the sacred Mandir asthal.
Appeasing sound of chanting mantras,Vandana,and veneration actually soothe the soul as if the entire area is witnessing the drizzle of blessings.
The pavitra(Sacred)mandir asthal has also been the main foundation of social concordance, harmony and fraternity.

Lawapur Narayan also marks the existence of many proficient and knowledgeable locals who holds vast knowledge of Vedas and shastras.

References

Villages in Vaishali district